The discography of Sheryl Crow, an American singer-songwriter, consists of 11 studio albums, four live albums, one live EP, six compilation albums, one box set, 45 singles, six promotional singles, 13 video albums, 57 music videos, 21 B-sides and 19 soundtrack contributions. She has sold over 50 million albums worldwide. According to RIAA, she has sold 16 million certified albums in the United States. Billboard named her the 5th Greatest Alternative Artist of all time.

After signing a contract with A&M Records and not wanting to release her own first attempt at a debut record thinking it was unmemorable, Crow finally released Tuesday Night Music Club in 1993. It remains her most successful effort to date and one of the best-selling albums of the 1990s, having sold more than ten million copies internationally by the end of the decade. Such hits as "All I Wanna Do", "Strong Enough", and "Can't Cry Anymore" garnered Crow's popularity on radio, while Tuesday Night Music Club became a Billboard 200 mainstay, rising from the debut spot at number 173 to its peak in the top five and spending exactly 100 weeks on the chart. The album also saw success in countries such as Australia and Canada and throughout Europe. In 1995, Crow won three Grammy Awards (out of five nominations), including for Best New Artist.

Her second album, Sheryl Crow, was released in 1996 and debuted at No. 6 on the Billboard 200, becoming Crow's second consecutive top ten album, spending over a year on the chart and ranking as the one of the most sold albums of 1996 and 1997. In less than a year, the album was certified as  triple platinum. The album produced five singles: "If It Makes You Happy", "Everyday Is a Winding Road", "Hard to Make a Stand", "A Change Would Do You Good", and "Home", with the first two peaking at Nos. 10 and 11 on the Billboard Hot 100, respectively. The self-titled record remains Crow's most critically acclaimed album to date. Crow won two Grammy Awards for this new effort in 1997 and one additional nomination in 1998. Shortly afterwards, Crow contributed to the Tomorrow Never Dies soundtrack, writing and performing the theme song for the James Bond movie. The song became Crow's fifth top-20 hit in the UK and received nominations for a Golden Globe and a Grammy.

Despite encountering difficulties in recording her third studio album, Crow released The Globe Sessions in 1998. Preceded by the top 20 hit single "My Favorite Mistake", the album debuted at No. 5 on the Billboard 200 and went on to sell more than two million copies in the United States. The Globe Sessions received five Grammy Award nominations, including for Album of the Year, but won only for Best Rock Album. The next year, Crow's rendition of the song "Sweet Child O'Mine" was included in the Big Daddy soundtrack and won a Grammy Award for Best Female Rock Vocal Performance. In addition, Crow released her first live album, recorded at Central Park in the company of guest musicians such as Keith Richards, Stevie Nicks, and Eric Clapton. The album was not as commercially successful as its predecessors, being certified as gold only in Canada but at the same time, garnered Crow three fresh Grammy nominations, winning Best Female Rock Vocal Performance for "There Goes the Neighborhood" in 2000.

C'mon, C'mon (2002), her following release, debuted at number two in the US, Canada and United Kingdom. The album became her highest debut in several countries and produced the hit single "Soak Up the Sun". The album helped Crow win an American Music Award and four Grammy Award nominations. Once again, Crow won Best Female Rock Vocal Performance, this time for the second single "Steve McQueen". In 2003, Crow released The Very Best of Sheryl Crow, her first greatest hits compilation. Propelled by the major hit single "The First Cut Is the Deepest", the album went on to sell over four million copies in the United States alone, staying inside the Billboard 200 for 80 weeks and becoming 2004's ninth best-selling album. Crow won two American Music Awards the next year in the categories Favorite Rock/Pop Female Artist and Favorite Adult Contemporary Artist.

Her fifth studio album, Wildflower (2005) debuted at No. 2 on the Billboard 200 and No. 1 on the Canadian Albums chart. The album was certified as platinum in less than a year and spawned the single "Always on Your Side", which became Crow's ninth Billboard Hot 100 top 40 hit. Wildflower received three Grammy nominations. In 2008, Crow released Detours, her first album in three years. Like its last two predecessors, the album debuted at No. 2 on the Billboard 200, remaining on the chart for over 20 weeks and becoming one of the year's best-sold albums. Her seventh studio album, 100 Miles from Memphis, was released in 2010 and became her last album on A&M Records.

After signing with Warner Music Nashville, Crow announced the release of her debut album in the country music format. Her ninth studio album, entitled Feels Like Home, was released September 10, 2013. The lead-off single, "Easy", saw release exclusively to country radio and became Crow's first top 20 country airplay hit.

Albums

Studio albums

Compilation albums

Live albums

EPs

Singles

1990s

2000s

2010s–2020s

Guest singles

Other charted songs

 A "A Change Would Do You Good" was not eligible to enter the Hot 100 but reached #19 on the Billboard Hot 100 Airplay chart.
 B An alternate version with Allison Moorer instead of Crow was released but is not included on Cocky.

Videos

Home videos and television concerts

Music videos

Video appearances

Collaborations
 1991: Belinda Carlisle: Live Your Life Be Free – Little Black Book and Half the World (background vocals, credited as Cherryl Crowe)
 1991: Kenny Loggins: Leap of Faith – I Would Do Anything (duet)
 1997: Dwight Yoakam: Under The Covers – Baby Don't Go (vocals)
 1998: Scott Weiland: 12 Bar Blues – Lady, Your Roof Brings Me Down (accordion)
 1999: Prince: Rave Un2 the Joy Fantastic – Baby Knows (duet, harmonica) / Everyday Is a Winding Road (writer)
 2000: Johnny Cash: American III: Solitary Man – Field of Diamonds (vocals)
 2001: Willie Nelson: All the Songs I've Loved Before: 40 Unforgettable Songs / 2013: To All the Girls... – Far Away Places (duet)
 2001: Tony Bennett: Playin' with My Friends: Bennett Sings the Blues – Good Morning Heartache (duet)
 2001: Stevie Nicks: Trouble in Shangri-La – Sorcerer / It's Only Love / Candlebright / Too Far from Texas / That Made Me Stronger / Fall From Grace (background vocals, guitar, bass, writer & producer)
 2002: Dixie Chicks: Home – Travelin' Soldier & Landslide (music producer)
 2002: Counting Crows: Hard Candy – American Girls (background vocals)
 2003: Fleetwood Mac: Say You Will – Say You Will & Silver Girl (Hammond organ & background vocals)
 2003: Rosanne Cash: Rules of Travel – Beautiful Pain (harmony vocal)
 2003: Michelle Branch: Hotel Paper – Love Me Like That (duet)
 2003: Kid Rock: Kid Rock – Run Off to LA (vocals)
 2004: The Rolling Stones: Live Licks – Honky Tonk Women (live duet)
 2004: Zucchero Fornaciari: Zu & Co. – Blue (duet)
 2007: Ryan Adams: Easy Tiger – Two (background vocals and harmony)
 2008: Rusty Truck: Luck's Changing Lanes – Cold Ground (backing vocals, acoustic guitar, accordion)
 2010: Jerry Lee Lewis: Mean Old Man – You Are My Sunshine (w/ Jon Brion)
 2010: Miley Cyrus: Hannah Montana Forever – Need A Little Love (vocals)
 2011: Tony Bennett: Duets II – The Girl I Love
 2011: Kid Rock: Born Free – Collide (w/ Bob Seger on piano) (duet)
 2012: Willie Nelson: Heroes – Come on Up to the House (w/ Lukas Nelson)
 2012: John Mellencamp, Dave Alvin, Phil Alvin & Taj Mahal: Ghost Brothers of Darkland County – 2013 theatrical play soundtrack, 7 songs
 2013: Amy Grant: How Mercy Looks from Here – Deep As It Is Wide (w/ Eric Paslay)
 2013: Charlie Worsham: Rubberband – Love Don't Die Easy (background vocals)
 2014: Smokey Robinson: Smokey & Friends – The Tears of a Clown (duet)
 2016: Eric Clapton And Guests: Crossroads Revisited – Selections From The Crossroads Guitar Festivals – Tulsa Time, On the Road Again (Willie Nelson song) & Lay Down Sally (w/ Vince Gill & Albert Lee / Our Love Is Fading (w/ Gary Clark Jr.) (live)
 2017: John Mayer: The Search for Everything – "In the Blood" (background vocals)
 2017: Rodney Crowell: Close Ties – "I'm Tied To Ya" (duet)
 2020: Yola: "Hold On" (piano)
 2021: Barry Gibb: Greenfields – "How Can You Mend a Broken Heart" (duet)
 2022: Toby Mac: Promised Land

Soundtracks

Films
 1991: Point Break (Music From The Motion Picture) – Hundreds Of Tears
 1995: Boys on the Side (Original Soundtrack Album) – Keep On Growing / Somebody Stand By Me (writer only)
 1997: Tomorrow Never Dies (Music From The Motion Picture) – Tomorrow Never Dies
 1998: Hope Floats (Music From The Motion Picture) – In Need
 1998: The Faculty (Music From The Dimension Motion Picture) – Resuscitation
 1998: Practical Magic (Music From The Motion Picture) – If You Ever Did Believe / Crystal (music producer and guest vocals w/ Stevie Nicks)
 1999: Big Daddy (Music From The Motion Picture) – Sweet Child o' Mine
 1999: Message in a Bottle (Music From And Inspired By The Motion Picture) – Carolina
 2000: Steal This Movie! (Music From The Motion Picture) – Time Has Come Today (w/ Steve Earle)
 2001: Bridget Jones's Diary (Music from the Motion Picture) – Kiss That Girl
 2001: I Am Sam (Music From and Inspired By the Motion Picture) – Mother Nature's Son
 2004: Alfie (Music From The Motion Picture) – Old Habits Die Hard (w/ Mick Jagger and David A. Stewart)
 2004: De-Lovely (Music from the Motion Picture) – Begin the Beguine
 2006: Cars (Original Soundtrack) – Real Gone
 2006: Home of the Brave (Original Motion Picture Soundtrack) – Try Not To Remember
 2007: Bee Movie (Music From The Motion Picture) – Here Comes the Sun

Television
 1996: The X-Files – Songs in the Key of X: Music from and Inspired by the X-Files – On the Outside
 1997: Live On Letterman (Music From The Late Show) – Strong Enough (Live)
 1999: King of the Hill (Music From And Inspired By The TV Series) – Straight to the Moon
 2000: VH1 Storytellers – Strong Enough (Live w/ Stevie Nicks from 1998)
 2001: The Best Of Sessions at West 54th – Everyday Is A Winding Road (Live from 1997)
 2002: The Very Best Of MTV Unplugged – Strong Enough (Live from 1995)
 2003: The Very Best Of MTV Unplugged 2 – Run, Baby, Run (Live from 1995)
 2004: The Very Best Of MTV Unplugged 3 – Leaving Las Vegas (Live from 1995)
 2008: Californication, Season 2: Music from the Showtime Series – Behind Blue Eyes
 2009: NCIS: The Official TV Soundtrack - Vol. 2 – Murder In My Heart

Live specials
 1994: Woodstock 94 – "Run, Baby, Run"
 1996: Pavarotti & Friends: For War Child – "Run, Baby, Run" (w/ Eric Clapton) / "Là ci darem la mano" (w/ Luciano Pavarotti)
 1998: Burt Bacharach – One Amazing Night – "One Less Bell to Answer"
 1999: Woodstock 1999 – "If It Makes You Happy"
 1999: A Very Special Christmas Live From Washington, D.C. – "Rockin' Around the Christmas Tree" (w/ Mary J. Blige) / "Merry Christmas Baby" (w/ Eric Clapton) / "Santa Claus Is Comin' to Town" (w/ everyone)
 2001: America: A Tribute to Heroes – "Safe and Sound"
 2001: A Very Special Christmas 5 – "Run Rudolph Run"
 2002: Willie Nelson & Friends – Stars & Guitars – "Whiskey River" / "For What It's Worth" (duets w/ Willie Nelson)
 2010: Hope for Haiti Now – "Lean on Me" (w/ Kid Rock & Keith Urban)
 2011: Best of Rock and Roll Hall of Fame + Museum: Live – "Midnight Rider" (w/ The Allman Brothers Band) from 1995 broadcast
 2011: The Bridge School Concerts: 25th Anniversary Edition – "The Difficult Kind"
 2012: We Walk the Line: A Celebration of the Music of Johnny Cash – "Cry! Cry! Cry!" / "If I Were a Carpenter" (w/ Willie Nelson) / "I Walk the Line" (w/ everyone)
 2013: Willie Nelson & Friends – Live at Third Man Records – "Far Away Places" / "Whiskey River"

Original music with no soundtrack album
 1990: Cop Rock episode "Bang the Potts Slowly" – I Got Somethin' For You
 1991: Bright Angel – Heal Somebody
 1991: Stone Cold – Welcome To the Real Life
 1995: The Pompatus of Love – The Joker (Steve Miller Band cover)
 1996: For Hope – My Funny Valentine (cover)
 2009: Cougar Town episode "Everything Man" – Everything Man
 2012: Katie – This Day (theme song)
 2012: GCB episode "Forbidden Fruit" – The Gospel According to Me
 2013: The Hot Flashes – Leaning in a New Direction
 2015: The Tonight Show Starring Jimmy Fallon December 15, 2015 episode – Revolution (Beatles song) (w/ The Roots)
 2016: A Boy Called Po – Dancing With Your Shadow (Burt Bacharach/Billy Mann cover)

Compilation appearances

Tribute albums
 1994: If I Were a Carpenter – Solitaire
 1995: Encomium: A Tribute to Led Zeppelin – D'yer Mak'er
 1999: Return of the Grievous Angel: A Tribute to Gram Parsons – Juanita (w/ Emmylou Harris)
 2001: Good Rockin' Tonight – The Legacy Of Sun Records – Who Will The Next Fool Be?
 2001: Timeless – Long Gone Lonesome Blues
 2001: Substitute – The Songs Of The Who – Behind Blue Eyes
 2002: Kindred Spirits: A Tribute to the Songs of Johnny Cash – Flesh and Blood (w/ Mary Chapin Carpenter & Emmylou Harris)
 2004: The Unbroken Circle (The Musical Heritage Of The Carter Family) – No Depression in Heaven
 2007: Anchored in Love: A Tribute to June Carter Cash – If I Were a Carpenter (w/ Willie Nelson)
 2010: Coal Miner's Daughter: A Tribute to Loretta Lynn – Coal Miner's Daughter (w/ Loretta Lynn & Miranda Lambert)
 2011: The Lost Notebooks of Hank Williams – Angel Mine

Benefit albums
 1997: A Very Special Christmas 3 – Blue Christmas
 1998: AT&T Presents Stormy Weather – Good Morning Heartache (live)
 2004: Marlo Thomas and Friends: Thanks & Giving All Year Long – All Kinds of People
 2015: Orthophonic Joy – The Wandering Boy (w/ Vince Gill)

References

Rock music discographies
Discographies of American artists
Discography